is a Japanese professional baseball player. He debuted in 2012 with the Hokkaido Nippon-Ham Fighters. He had 3 runs in 2013.

References

Living people
1992 births
Baseball people from Mie Prefecture
Japanese baseball players
Nippon Professional Baseball outfielders
Hokkaido Nippon-Ham Fighters players